Eugène Bourgoin (12 February 1880 – 30 October 1924) was a French sculptor. His work was part of the sculpture event in the art competition at the 1924 Summer Olympics.

References

1880 births
1924 deaths
19th-century French sculptors
20th-century French sculptors
20th-century French male artists
French male sculptors
Olympic competitors in art competitions
Artists from Reims
19th-century French male artists